Bangbae station, also known as Baekseok Arts University station, is a subway station on the Line 2 of the Seoul Metropolitan Subway. The station is located in the Bangbae neighborhood of Seocho District, Seoul. The tomb of Grand Prince Hyoryeong, the second son of King Taejong—the third monarch of the Joseon Dynasty—is located to the northeast.

Station layout

Vicinity
Exit 1: Sangmun High School, Sindonga APT
Exit 2: Daewoo Hyoryeong APT
Exit 3: Isu Middle School
Exit 4: Tomb of Grand Prince Hyoryeong, Bangil Elementary School

References

Metro stations in Seocho District
Seoul Metropolitan Subway stations
Railway stations opened in 1983
1983 establishments in South Korea
20th-century architecture in South Korea